Wild Kat is an Australian children's television series that first screened on Network Ten in 2001.

Plot
Wild Kat tells the story of 15-year-old Katrina and her 11-year-old brother Jamie, who are sent to live with their mother at Perth Zoo. Kat discovers that she can "mind meld" with Garang, a ferocious female tiger that prowls the Big Cat Enclosure at the City Zoo. The tiger is able to project her own moods and emotions onto Wild Kat, triggering extraordinary powers and abilities for the teenager.

Cast List
 Pia Prendiville as Katrina Ryan
 Daniel Daperis as Jamie Ryan
 Marta Kaczmarek as Dr. Lydia Raushark
 Paris Abbott as Jasmin Ainsworth
 Nicolette Findlay as Kristen Ainsworth 
 Luke Pegler as Alex 
 Karin Hampton as Erica Moore 
 Ewen Leslie as Morgan Ritchie

See also
 List of Australian television series

References

External links

Wild Kat at Australian Television Information Archive

Network 10 original programming
Australian children's television series
2001 Australian television series debuts
2001 Australian television series endings
Television shows set in Perth, Western Australia